Grace Memorial Episcopal Church is a historic church at 100 W. Church Street in Hammond, Louisiana, U.S.A.

It was built in 1876, consecrated in 1888, and added to the National Register of Historic Places in 1973.

See also
Charles Emery Cate (1831-1916)
National Register of Historic Places listings in Tangipahoa Parish, Louisiana

References

External links
Official website
Grace Memorial Episcopal Church Cemetery on Find a Grave

Episcopal church buildings in Louisiana
Churches on the National Register of Historic Places in Louisiana
Carpenter Gothic church buildings in Louisiana
Churches completed in 1876
Churches in Tangipahoa Parish, Louisiana
19th-century Episcopal church buildings
National Register of Historic Places in Tangipahoa Parish, Louisiana